Acoma Pueblo is a Native American pueblo approximately  west of Albuquerque, New Mexico, in the United States. Four communities make up the village of Acoma Pueblo: Sky City (Old Acoma), Acomita, Anzac, and McCartys. These communities are located near the expansive Albuquerque metropolitan area, which includes several large cities and towns, including neighboring Laguna Pueblo. Today, much of the Acoma community is primarily within the Acoma Indian Reservation. Acoma Pueblo is a National Historic Landmark.

According to the 2010 United States Census, 4,989 people identified as Acoma. The Acoma have continuously occupied the area for over 2000 years, making this one of the oldest continuously inhabited communities in the United States (along with Taos and Hopi pueblos). Acoma tribal traditions estimate that they have lived in the village for more than two thousand years.

Names

The name does not have any meaning in the modern Acoma language. Some tribal authorities connect it to the similar word , 'preparedness, place of preparedness', and suggest that this might be the origin of the name. The name does not mean 'sky city'. Other tribal elders assert that it means 'place that always was', while outsiders say it means 'people of the white rock'.

Acoma has been spelled in various other ways in historical documents, including ákuma, ákomage, Acus, Acux, Aacus, Hacús, Vacus, Vsacus, Yacco, Acco, Acuca, Acogiya, Acuco, Coco, Suco, Akome, Acuo, Ako, and A’ku-me.

 is the Spanish word for 'village' or 'small town' and 'people'. In general usage, it is applied both to the people and to the unique architecture of the southwestern native tribes.

Language

The Acoma language is classified in the western division of the Keresan languages. In contemporary Acoma Pueblo culture, most people speak both Acoma and English. Elders were forced to speak Spanish.

History

Origins and prehistory

Pueblo people are believed to have descended from the Ancestral Puebloans, Mogollon, and other ancient peoples. These influences are seen in the architecture, farming style, and artistry of the Acoma. In the 13th century, the Ancestral Puebloans abandoned their canyon homelands due to climate change and social upheaval. For more than two centuries, there were migrations in the area. The Acoma Pueblo emerged by the 13th century. However, the Acoma themselves say the Sky City Pueblo was established in the 11th century, with brick buildings as early as 1144 on the mesa. Evidence for their antiquity is the unique lack of adobe in their construction. This early founding date makes Acoma Pueblo one of the earliest continuously inhabited communities in the United States.

The isolation and location of the Pueblo has sheltered the community for more than 1,200 years as they sought protection from the raids of the neighboring Navajo and Apache peoples.

European contact

The first mention of Acoma was in 1539. Estevanico, a slave, was the first non-Indian to visit Acoma and reported it to Marcos de Niza, who related the information to the viceroy of New Spain after the end of his expedition. Acoma was called the independent Kingdom of Hacus. He called the Acoma people encaconados, which meant that they had turquoise hanging from their ears and noses.

Lieutenant Hernando de Alvarado of conquistador Francisco Vázquez de Coronado's expedition described the Pueblo (which they called Acuco) in 1540 as "a very strange place built upon solid rock" and "one of the strongest places we have seen." Upon visiting the Pueblo, the expedition "repented having gone up to the place." Further from Alvarado's report:

It is believed Coronado's expedition were the first Europeans to encounter the Acoma (Estevan was a native Moroccan).  Alvarado reported that first the Acoma refused entry even after persuasions, but after Alvarado showed threats of an attack, the Acoma guards welcomed the Spaniards peacefully, noting that they and their horses were tired. The encounter shows that the Acoma had clothing made of deerskin, buffalohide, and woven cotton, as well as turquoise jewelry, domestic turkeys, bread, pine nuts, and maize. The village seemed to contain about 200 men.

Acoma was next visited by the Spanish 40 years later in 1581 by Fray Agustín Rodríguez and Francisco Sánchez Chamuscado, with 12 soldiers, 3 other friars, and 13 others, including Indian servants. The Acoma at this time were reported to be somewhat defensive and fearful. This response may have been due to the knowledge of the Spanish enslavement of other Indians to work in silver mines in the area. However, eventually the Rodríguez and Chamuscado party convinced them to trade goods for food. The Spaniard reports say the pueblo had about 500 houses of either three or four stories high.

In 1582, Acoma was visited again by Antonio de Espejo for three months. The Acoma were reported to be wearing mantas. Espejo also noted irrigation in Acomita, the farming village in the north valley near San Jose River, which was two leagues from the mesa. He saw evidence of intertribal trade with "mountain Querechos". Acoma oral history does not confirm this trade but only tells of common messengers to and from the mesa and Acomita, McCartys Village, and Seama.

Juan de Oñate intended to colonize New Mexico starting from 1595 (he formally held the area by April 1598). The Acoma warrior Zutacapan heard of this plan and warned the mesa and organized a defense. However, a pueblo elder, Chumpo, dissuaded war, partly to prevent deaths and partly based on Zutancalpo's (Zutacapan's son) mentioning of the widespread belief that the Spaniards were immortal. Thus, when Oñate visited on October 27, 1598, Acoma met him peacefully, with no resistance to Oñate's demand of surrender and obedience reported. Oñate demonstrated his military power by firing a gun salute. Zutacapan offered to meet Oñate formally in the religious kiva, which is traditionally used as the place to make sacred oaths and pledges. However, Oñate was scared of death and in suspicious ignorance of Acoma customs refused to enter via ladder from the roof into the dark kiva chambers. Purguapo was another Acoma man out of four chosen for Spaniard negotiations.

Soon after Oñate's departure, Gaspar Pérez de Villagrá visited Acoma by himself with a dog and a horse and asked for other supplies. Villagrá refused to get off his horse and left to follow Oñate's party. However, Zutacapan convinced him to return to receive supplies. In questioning by Zutacapan, Villagrá said that 103 armed men were two days away from Acoma. Zutacapan then told Villagrá to leave Acoma.

On December 1, 1598, Juan de Zaldívar, Oñate's nephew, reached Acoma with 20–30 men and peacefully traded with them and had to wait some days for their order of ground corn. On December 4, Zaldívar went with 16 armored men to Acoma to find out about the corn. Zutacapan met them and directed them to the homes with the corn. Zaldívar's people then divided into groups to collect the corn. The traditional oral Acoma narrative tells that a group attacked some Acoma women, leading Acoma warriors to retaliate. The Spanish documents do not report an attack on the women and say that the division of the men was a reaction to Zutacapan's plan to kill Zaldívar's party. The Acoma killed 12 of the Spaniards, including Zaldívar. Five men escaped, although one died from jumping over the citadel, leaving four to escape with the remaining camp.

On December 20, 1598, Oñate learned of Zaldívar's death and, after receiving encouraging advice from the friars, planned an attack in revenge, as well to teach a lesson to other pueblos. Acomas requested help from other tribes to defend against the Spanish. Among the leaders were Gicombo, Popempol, Chumpo, Calpo, Buzcoico, Ezmicaio, and Bempol (a recruited Apache war leader). On January 21, 1599, Vicente de Zaldívar (Juan de Zaldívar's brother) reached Acoma with 70 soldiers. The Acoma Massacre started the next day and lasted for three days. On January 23, men were able to climb the southern mesa unnoticed by Acoma guards and breach the pueblo. The Spanish dragged a cannon through the streets, toppling adobe walls and burning most of the village, killing 800 people (decimating 20% of the 4,000 population) and imprisoning approximately 500 others. Almost all of the remaining inhabitants were enslaved or left the town. The pueblo surrendered at noon on January 24. Zaldívar lost only one of his men. The Spanish amputated the right feet of men over 25 years old and forced them into slavery for 20 years. They also took males aged 12–25 and females over 12 away from their parents, putting most of them in slavery for 20 years. The enslaved Acoma were given to government officials and various missions. Two other Indian men visiting Acoma at the time had their right hands cut off and were sent back to their respective Pueblos as a warning of the consequences for resisting the Spanish. On the north side of the mesa, a row of houses still retains marks from the fire started by a cannon during this Acoma War. (Oñate was later exiled from New Mexico for mismanagement, false reporting, and cruelty by Philip III of Spain.)

Survivors of the Acoma Massacre rebuilt their community between 1599 and 1620. The town remained uninhabited for several months, out of fear of more attacks, until it began to be rebuilt in December 1599. Oñate forced the Acoma and other local Indians to pay taxes in crops, cotton, and labor. Spanish rule also brought Catholic missionaries into the area. The Spanish renamed the pueblos with the names of saints and started to construct churches in them. They introduced new crops to the Acoma, including peaches, peppers, and wheat. A 1620 royal decree created Spanish civil offices in each pueblo, including Acoma, with an appointed governor to take command. In 1680, the Pueblo Revolt took place, with Acoma participating. The revolt brought refugees from other pueblos. Those who eventually left Acoma moved elsewhere to form Laguna Pueblo.

The Acoma suffered high mortality from smallpox epidemics, as they had no immunity to such Eurasian infectious diseases. They also suffered raiding from the Apache, Comanche, and Ute. On occasion, the Acoma would side with the Spanish to fight against these nomadic tribes. Forced to formally adopt Catholicism, the Acoma proceeded to practice their traditional religion in secrecy, and combined elements of both in a syncretic blend. Intermarriage and interaction became common among the Acoma, other pueblos, and Hispanic villages. These communities would intermingle in a kind of creolization to form the culture of New Mexico.

San Esteban Del Rey Mission

Between 1629 and 1641 Father Juan Ramirez oversaw construction of the San Estevan Del Rey Mission Church. The Acoma were ordered to build the church, moving  of adobe, straw, sandstone, and mud to the mesa for the church walls. The  church has an altar flanked by -high wood pillars. These are hand carved in red and white designs, representing Christian and Indigenous beliefs. The Acoma know their ancestors' hands built this structure, and they consider it a cultural treasure.

In 1970, it was placed on the National Register of Historic Places. In 2007, the mission church was designated a National Trust Historic Site, the only Native American site in that ranking as identified by the National Trust for Historic Preservation, a non-profit organization.

19th and 20th century

During the 19th century, the Acoma people, while trying to uphold traditional life, also adopted aspects of the once-rejected Spanish culture and religion. By the 1880s, railroads brought increased numbers of settlers and ended the pueblos' isolation.

In the 1920s, the All Indian Pueblo Council gathered for the first time in more than 300 years. Responding to congressional interest in appropriating Pueblo lands, the U.S. Congress passed the Pueblo Lands Act in 1924. Despite successes in retaining their land, the Acoma had difficulty in preserving their cultural traditions in the 20th century. Protestant missionaries established schools in the area, and the Bureau of Indian Affairs forced Acoma children into boarding schools. By 1922, most children from the community were in boarding schools, where they were forced to use English and practice Christianity. Several generations became cut off from their culture and language, with harsh effects on their families and societies.

Present day

About 300 two- and three-story adobe buildings stand on the mesa, with exterior ladders used to access the upper levels where residents live. Access to the mesa is by a road blasted into the rock face during the 1950s, navigable by car and bus. Footpaths down the mesa can still be used. Approximately 30 or so people live permanently on the mesa, with the population increasing on the weekends, as family members come to visit, and tourists, some 55,000 annually, visit for the day.

Acoma Pueblo has no electricity, running water, or sewage disposal. Reservation lands surround the mesa, totaling . Tribal members live both on the reservation and outside it. Contemporary Acoma culture remains relatively closed. According to the 2000 United States census, 4,989 people identify themselves as Acoma.

Culture

Governance and reservation

Acoma government was maintained by two individuals: a cacique, or head of the Pueblo, and a war captain, who would serve until their deaths. Both individuals maintained strong religious connections to their work, representing the theocracy of Acoma governance. The Spanish imposed a group to oversee the Pueblo, but their power was not taken seriously by the Acoma. The Spanish group would work with external situations and comprised a governor, two lieutenant governors, and a council. The Acoma also participated in the All Indian Pueblo Council, which started in 1598 and arose again in the 20th century.

Since 1977, the Acoma have increased their domain through several land purchases. On the reservation, only tribal members may own land and almost all enrolled members live on the property. The cacique is still active in the community and is from the Antelope clan. The cacique appoints tribal council members, staff, and the governor.

In 2011, Acoma Pueblo and the Pueblo of Santa Clara were victims of heavy flooding. New Mexico supplied more than $1 million to fund emergency preparedness and damage repair for victims, and governor Susana Martinez requested additional funding from the Federal Emergency Management Agency.

Warfare and weaponry
Historically, engagements in warfare were common for Acoma, like other Pueblos. Weapons used included clubs, stones, spears, and darts. The Acoma later would serve as auxiliaries for forces under Spain and Mexico, fighting against raids and protecting merchants on the Santa Fe Trail. After the 19th century, raiding tribes were less of a threat and Acoma military culture began to decline. The war captain position eventually would change to a civil and religious function.

Architecture

Acoma Pueblo has three rows of three-story, apartment-style buildings, which face south on top of the mesa. The buildings are constructed from adobe brick, with beams across the roof that were covered with poles, brush, and then plaster. The roof for one level would serve as the floor for another. Each level is connected to others by ladders, serving as a unique defensive aid; the ladders are the only way to enter the buildings, as the traditional design has no windows or doors. The lower levels of the buildings were used for storage. Baking ovens are outside the buildings, with water being collected from two natural cisterns. Acoma also has seven rectangular kivas and a village plaza, which serves as the spiritual center for the village.

Family life
About 20 matrilineal clans were recognized by the Acoma. Traditional child rearing involved very little discipline. Couples were generally monogamous, and divorce was rare. A quick burial followed death, then four days and nights of vigil. Women wore cotton dresses and sandals or high moccasin boots. Men wore cotton kilts and leather sandals. Rabbit and deer skin was also used for clothing and robes. In the 17th century, horses were introduced to the Pueblo by the Spanish. Education was overseen by kiva headmen, who taught about human behavior, spirit and body, astrology, ethics, child psychology, oratory, history, dance, and music.

Since the 1970s, Acoma Pueblo has retained control over education services, which have been keys in maintaining traditional and contemporary lifestyles. They share a high school with Laguna Pueblo. Alcoholism, drug use, and other health issues are prominent on the reservation and Indian Health Service hospitals and native healers cooperate to battle health problems. Alcohol is banned on the Pueblo. The community is served by the Acoma-Canoncito-Laguna (ACL) Hospital run by the Indian Health Services and located in Acoma. Today, 19 clans still remain active.

Religion
Traditional Acoma religion stresses harmony between life and nature. The sun is a representative of the Creator deity. Mountains surrounding the community, the sun above, and the earth below help to balance and define the Acoma world. Traditional religious ceremonies may revolve around the weather, including seeking to ensure healthy rainfall. The Acoma also use kachinas in rituals. The Pueblos also had one or more kivas, which served as religious chambers. The leader of each Pueblo would serve as the community religious leader, or cacique. The cacique would observe the sun and use it as a guide for scheduling ceremonies, some which were kept secret.

Many Acoma are Catholic, but blend aspects of Catholicism and their traditional religion. Many old rituals are still performed. In September, the Acoma honor their patron saint, Saint Stephen. For feast day, the mesa is opened to the public for the celebration. More than 2,000 pilgrims attend the San Esteban Festival. The celebration begins at San Esteban Del Rey Mission, and a carved pine effigy of Saint Stephen is removed from the altar and carried into the main plaza with people chanting, shooting rifles, and ringing steeple bells. The procession then proceeds past the cemetery, down narrow streets, and to the plaza. Upon arriving at the plaza, the effigy is placed in a shrine lined with woven blankets and guarded by two Acoma men. A celebration follows with dancing and feasting. During the festival, vendors sell goods, such as traditional pottery and cuisine.

Subsistence
Before contact with the Spanish, Acoma people primarily ate corn, beans, and squash. Mut-tze-nee was a popular thin corn bread. They also raised turkeys, tobacco, and sunflowers. The Acoma hunted antelope, deer, and rabbits. Wild seeds, berries, nuts, and other foods were gathered. After 1700, new foods were noted in the historical record. Staples included blue corn drink, pudding, corn mush, corn balls, wheat cake, peach-bark drink, paper bread, flour bread, wild berries, and prickly pear fruit. After contact with the Spanish, goats, horses, sheep and donkeys were raised.

In contemporary Acoma, other foods are also popular, such as apple pastries, corn tamales, green-chili stew with lamb, fresh corn, and wheat pudding with brown sugar.

Irrigation techniques such as dams and terraces were used for agriculture. Farming tools were made of wood and stone. Harvested corn would be ground with hands and mortar.

Ethnobotany
A list of Acoma Pueblo ethnobotany shows 68 documented plant uses.

In 1932, George R. Swank published a Master's thesis titled "The Ethnobotany of the Acoma and Laguna Indians," containing short sections on the Puebloans' history, culture and mythology as well as an extensive treatment of plant uses and names.

Economy

Historical Acoma economic practices are described as socialistic or communal. Labor was shared and produce was distributed equally. Trading networks were extensive, spreading thousands of miles throughout the region. During fixed times in the summer and fall, trading fairs were held. The largest fair was held in Taos by the Comanche. Nomadic traders would exchange slaves, buckskins, buffalo hide, jerky, and horses. Pueblo people would trade for copper and shell ornaments, macaw feathers, and turquoise. Since 1821, the Acoma traded via the Santa Fe Trail. The arrival of railroads in the 1880s made the Acoma dependent on American-made goods, which suppressed traditional arts such as weaving and pottery.

Today, the Acoma produce a variety of goods. They grow alfalfa, oats, wheat, chilies, corn, melon, squash, vegetables, and fruit, and they raise cattle. They have natural reserves of gas, geothermal, and coal resources. Uranium mines in the area provided work for the Acoma until their closings in the 1980s. After that, the tribe provided most employment. However, high unemployment rates trouble the Pueblo. The uranium mines left radiation pollution, causing the tribal fishing lake to be drained and some health problems within the community.

Tourism

Tourism is a major source of income for the tribe. In 2008, Pueblo Acoma opened the Sky City Cultural Center and Haak'u Museum at the base of the mesa, replacing the original, which was destroyed by fire in 2000. The center and museum seek to sustain and preserve Acoma culture. Films about Acoma history are shown and a café serves traditional foods. The architecture was inspired by pueblo design and indigenous architectural traditions, with wide doorways in the middle, which in traditional homes make the bringing of supplies easier. The windowpanes contain flecks of mica, a mineral which is used to create mesa windows. The complex is also fire resistant, unlike traditional pueblos, and is painted in light pinks and purples to match the landscape surrounding it. Traditional Acoma artwork is exhibited and demonstrated at the center, including ceramic chimneys crafted on the rooftop. Arts and crafts also bring income.

Acoma Pueblo is open to the public by guided tour from March until October, though June and July have periods of closure for cultural activities. Photography of the Pueblo and surrounding land is restricted. Tours and camera permits are purchased at the Sky City Cultural Center. While photography is allowed with permit, video recordings, drawings, and sketching are prohibited. All photography is forbidden within the church.

The Acoma Pueblo also has a casino and hotel - the Sky City Casino Hotel. The casino and hotel are alcohol-free and are maintained by the Acoma Business Enterprise, which oversees most Acoma businesses.

Arts

At Acoma, pottery remains one of the most notable artforms. Men create weavings and silver jewelry, as well.

Pottery

Acoma pottery dates back more than 1,000 years. Dense local clay, dug up at a nearby site, is essential to Acoma pottery. The clay is dried and strengthened by the addition of pulverized pottery shards. The pieces then are shaped, painted, and fired. Geometric patterns, thunderbirds, and rainbows are traditional designs, which are applied with the spike of a yucca. A potter lightly strikes the side of the pot upon completion and holds it to his or her ear; if the pot does not ring, it will crack during firing. If this is found, the piece is destroyed and ground into shards for future use.

Communities
 Acomita
 Anzac
 McCartys
 Sky Line
 Old Sky Line

Notable people
Loren Aragon, fashion designer
 Marie Chino, traditional pottery artist
 Vera Chino, traditional pottery artist
 Lucy Lewis, traditional pottery artist
Georgene Louis, attorney and member of the New Mexico House of Representatives
 Simon J. Ortiz, poet, author, and educator
 Anton Docher, "The Padre of Isleta", French priest
Rachel Concho, traditional pottery artist known for seed pots

Gallery

See also

 San Estevan Del Rey Mission Church
 Acoma Indian Reservation
 Solomon Bibo
 Enchanted Mesa
 National Register of Historic Places listings in Cibola County, New Mexico
 List of National Historic Landmarks in New Mexico
 List of Indian reservations in the United States
 List of Native American peoples in the United States
 List of the oldest buildings in the United States

References

Further reading
 Minge, Ward Alan and Simon Ortiz. Acoma: Pueblo in the Sky. Albuquerque: University of New Mexico Press (1991).

External links

AcomaZuni.com: Acoma "Sky City"

 
Puebloan peoples
Pueblo great houses
Native American tribes in New Mexico
Federally recognized tribes in the United States
12th-century architecture
Buildings and structures in Cibola County, New Mexico
Populated places in Cibola County, New Mexico
History of Cibola County, New Mexico
National Historic Landmarks in New Mexico
Archaeological sites on the National Register of Historic Places in New Mexico
Historic American Buildings Survey in New Mexico
Tourist attractions in Cibola County, New Mexico
National Register of Historic Places in Cibola County, New Mexico
Pueblos on the National Register of Historic Places in New Mexico
Historic districts on the National Register of Historic Places in New Mexico